Fombawi, also known as Fombaoui, is a town in the Ouenou arrondissement in the Borgou Department of Benin. It is an administrative division under the jurisdiction of the commune of Nikki. According to the population census in 2013, the village had a total population of 2,348.

References 
Borgou Department
Populated places in Benin